Alfred Scott may refer to:

Alfred Scott (New Zealand cricketer) (1901–1984), New Zealand cricketer
Alfred Scott (West Indian cricketer) (born 1934), West Indian cricketer
Alfred Angas Scott (1875–1923), motorcycle designer, inventor and founder of the Scott Motorcycle Company
Alfred Henry Scott (British politician) (1868–1939), British Liberal politician
Alfred Henry Scott (Canadian politician) (1840–1872), bartender and politician in Manitoba

See also
Al Scott (disambiguation)